Fencing at the 2013 Asian Youth Games was held in Nanjing International Expo Center Hall E from 19 to 21 August 2013 in Nanjing, China.

Medalists

Boys

Girls

Medal table

Results

Boys

Épée
20 August

Round of pools

Knockout round

Foil
21 August

Round of pools

Knockout round

Sabre
19 August

Round of pools

Knockout round

Girls

Épée
20 August

Round of pools

Knockout round

Foil
19 August

Round of pools

Knockout round

Sabre
21 August

Round of pools

Knockout round

References
 Boys' Epee Medalists
 Boys' Foil Medalists
 Boys' Sabre Medalists
 Girls' Epee Medalists
 Girls' Foil Medalists
 Girls' Sabre Medalists

2013 Asian Youth Games events
Asian Youth Games
2013 Asian Youth Games
International fencing competitions hosted by China